Live Alive Quo was the third live album by English rock band Status Quo and was broadcast live on BBC Radio 1 as part of the station's 25th Anniversary 'Party in the Park' celebrations in Birmingham, England. The concert was watched by nearly 125,000 fans.

Roadhouse Medley is a 20-minute track, consisting of the main riff from The Doors' song "Roadhouse Blues", long instrumental sections and a medley of Quo tracks "The Wanderer", "Marguerita Time", "Living on an Island", "Break the Rules", "Something 'Bout You Baby I Like" and "The Price of Love". This medley section from the middle was released as a single. The track "Caroline" is the encore from the live set.

Track listings

Vinyl
"Whatever You Want" (Rick Parfitt, Andy Bown)
"In the Army Now" (Bolland, Bolland)
"Burning Bridges (On and Off and On Again)" (Francis Rossi, Andy Bown)
"Rockin' All Over the World" (John Fogerty)
"Caroline" (Rossi, Young)
"Roadhouse Medley" 
"Roadhouse Blues" (Jim Morrison, John Densmore, Ray Manzarek, Robbie Krieger)
"The Wanderer" (Ernie Maresca)
"Marguerita Time" Frost, Rossi
"Living on an Island" Young, Parfitt
"Break The Rules" Lancaster, Young, Rossi, Coghlan, Parfitt
"Something 'Bout You Baby I Like" (Richard Supa)
"The Price of Love" (D. Everly & P. Everly)
"Roadhouse Blues" (Morrison, Densmore, Manzarek, Krieger)

CD
The last three tracks on the CD release - "Don't Drive My Car", "Hold You Back" and "Little Lady" - were recorded at a separate concert at Wembley Arena in 1990.

2006 reissue bonus track
"Roadhouse Medley" (single version) (Maresca/Rossi/Frost/Parfitt/Young/Lancaster/Coghlan/Supa)

Personnel
Francis Rossi - Vocals & lead guitar
Rick Parfitt - Vocals & guitar
John Edwards - Bass
Andy Bown - Keyboards
Jeff Rich - Drums

Charts

References

Status Quo (band) live albums
1992 live albums
Polydor Records live albums